Lystrocteisa is a genus of jumping spiders endemic to New Caledonia. It contains only one species, Lystrocteisa myrmex.

Name
The species name myrmex is Greek for ant.

References

  (2007): The world spider catalog, version 8.0. American Museum of Natural History.

External links
 Diagnostic drawings of L. myrmex

Salticidae
Spiders of Oceania
Monotypic Salticidae genera